Saved by the Bell: The College Years is an American television sitcom, and sequel to Saved by the Bell. It is the third incarnation of the franchise, and ran for one season, premiering on May 22, 1993, and airing its final episode on February 8, 1994. It is the only series of the franchise to air on primetime television instead of Saturday mornings – it aired on NBC on Tuesday evenings. The series follows Zach, Screech and A.C. Slater, and their three female suitemates, including Kelly Kapowski, in the dorms at college. It was followed by a television film, Saved by the Bell: Wedding in Las Vegas, which aired in October 1994.

Premise
In the series pilot, six characters live in the dorms at the fictitious California University, or Cal U, under the watchful eye of Mike Rogers, their resident adviser. The first-year dorm residents include Zack Morris, Screech Powers, and A.C. Slater from the original Saved by the Bell, along with newcomers Leslie Burke, Alex Tabor, and Danielle Marks. After The College Years pilot, Danielle Marks, played by Essence Atkins was written out, and was replaced on the show with Zack's former Saved by the Bell girlfriend, Kelly Kapowski. The series revolves around the troubles each of the six characters gets into every week, as well as Zack's various schemes to try to get his suitemates, first Leslie, and then Kelly, to fall for him. Later in the series, Dean McMann, played by Holland Taylor, becomes involved with trying to rein in the first-years' antics.

Cast
Mark-Paul Gosselaar as Zack Morris
Mario Lopez as A.C. Slater
Dustin Diamond as Samuel "Screech" Powers
Tiffani-Amber Thiessen as Kelly Kapowski
Anne Tremko as Leslie Burke
Kiersten Warren as Alex Tabor
Bob Golic as Mike Rogers
Essence Atkins as Danielle Marks (pilot only)
Patrick Fabian as Professor Jeremiah Lasky
Holland Taylor as Dean Susan McMann

Episodes

Home media
Saved by the Bell: The College Years was released on DVD in Region 1 by Image Entertainment on August 17, 2004.

Reception
The series was cancelled due to low ratings, averaging only a 7.8/12 rating/share, and ranking 88th out of 118 shows in the yearly ratings. It had to deal with viewer competition from both Full House and the first half of Rescue 911, both of which ranked in the Nielsen Top 30 that season. Only 19 episodes were produced. The nineteenth episode, "Wedding Plans", left the series with a cliffhanger ending, where Zack and Kelly had not yet married.

Film
A 90-minute TV movie, Saved by the Bell: Wedding in Las Vegas, was produced to wrap up the series. The events of the final episode of the series lead directly into the film, which shows the characters on a road trip to Las Vegas for Zack and Kelly's impending wedding and the comic misadventures they have along the way. Tom Jicha of the Sun-Sentinel said, "This movie would have been more appropriate for the time period in which all these stories began - Saturday morning."

Saved By the Bell: The College Years novels
Four novelizations based on the show were released in late 1994 by the publisher Aladdin Paperbacks, all written by Beth Cruise. The books all feature the main cast, and have similar storylines that relate to the main plots in the TV sequel.

Legacy
Zack and Slater, and Lisa, who only appears in the followup Wedding in Las Vegas film, all appear again on the Saved by the Bell: The New Class, in its second season finale episode, "Goodbye Bayside: Part 2". Slater appears one additional time on The New Class, in the fourth season finale episode, "Fire at the Max: Part 2". Screech would return in Saved by the Bell: The New Class, coming on as Mr. Belding's administrative assistant on a work-study program from Cal U, starting with the series' second season, and continuing as a main character in The New Class for the rest of its run.

A.C. Slater, and Jessie Spano from the original series, became main characters in the 2020 Saved by the Bell sequel series, while Zack, Kelly, and Lisa all would make guest appearances on the show. The 2020 sequel series also revisited The College Years by creating a flashback scene with Jessie visiting Slater at his dorm.

References

External links

 

1993 American television series debuts
1994 American television series endings
1990s American college television series
1990s American teen sitcoms
English-language television shows
NBC original programming
College Years, The
American sequel television series
Television series by CBS Studios
Television series by Universal Television
Television shows set in California